Plethiandra is a genus of flowering plants belonging to the family Melastomataceae.

Its native range is Western Malesia.

Species:

Plethiandra beccariana 
Plethiandra cuneata 
Plethiandra hookeri 
Plethiandra motleyi 
Plethiandra robusta 
Plethiandra sessiliflora 
Plethiandra sessilis 
Plethiandra tomentosa

References

Melastomataceae
Melastomataceae genera